Daana Paani is a 1953 Indian Hindi-language film starring Meena Kumari and Bharat Bhushan in lead roles. The music was composed by Mohan Junior. After the success of Baiju Bawra released in 1952, Bhushan and Kumari were paired again in this film. A 15 year old Shashi Kapoor appeared as a child artist with the name Master Shashiraj in the film.

Cast 
 Bharat Bhushan
 Meena Kumari
 Ulhas
 Veera
 Master Shashiraj
 Vasti

Music 
The film had eight songs and all songs were composed by Mohan Junior, a Gujarati film composer.
 "Koi Amir Hai Koi Gareeb Hai" – Mohammed Rafi, lyrics by: Kaif Irfani
 "Tere Haatho Me – Duet" – Mohammed Rafi, Geeta Dutt, lyrics by: Indeevar
 "Tum Hanse To Gham Sharmaya" – Mohammed Rafi, Shamshad Begum, lyrics by: Kaif Irfani
 "Ishq Mujhe Aur To Kuch Yaad Nahi" – Begum Akhtar, lyrics by: Kaif Irfani
 "Tere Haatho Me – Female version" – Rajkumari Dubey, lyrics by: Kaif Irfani
 "Chanda Suraj Naina Tere" – Madhubala Jhaveri, lyrics by: Indeevar
 "Mere Daddy Bade Meharba " – Madan Bharti, lyrics by: Kaif Irfani
 "Apna To Zamane Me Bas Itna" – Madhubala Jhaveri, lyrics by: Indeevar

References

External links 

1950s Hindi-language films
Indian black-and-white films